Leandro da Silva (born 26 June 1985) is a Brazilian former football player.

Career

Club
Leandro had previously played two years in Poland and Hungary with Pogoń Szczecin and Kaposvári Rákóczi FC before moving to Vladivostok with fellow Brazilian Kaposvári and his teammate Andre Alves in July 2008. Spartak Nalchik had signed Leandro from FC Luch-Energiya Vladivostok on 20 February 2009.

On 30 June 2013, Leandro had signed for Volga Nizhny Novgorod, and leaving the club by mutual consent on 31 March 2016.

On 13 March 2018, Leandro had signed a one-year contract with FK Atlantas.

Career statistics

Club

References

External links
  Player page on the official Luch-Energiya website
 

1985 births
Sportspeople from Goiás
Living people
Brazilian footballers
Association football defenders
Esporte Clube XV de Novembro (Piracicaba) players
Pogoń Szczecin players
Kaposvári Rákóczi FC players
FC Luch Vladivostok players
PFC Spartak Nalchik players
FC Arsenal Kyiv players
FC Kuban Krasnodar players
FC Volga Nizhny Novgorod players
FC Stal Kamianske players
FK Atlantas players
FC Rukh Lviv players
Ekstraklasa players
Nemzeti Bajnokság I players
Russian Premier League players
Ukrainian Premier League players
Russian First League players
A Lyga players
Ukrainian First League players
Brazilian expatriate footballers
Expatriate footballers in Poland
Brazilian expatriate sportspeople in Poland
Expatriate footballers in Hungary
Brazilian expatriate sportspeople in Hungary
Expatriate footballers in Russia
Brazilian expatriate sportspeople in Russia
Expatriate footballers in Ukraine
Brazilian expatriate sportspeople in Ukraine
Expatriate footballers in Lithuania
Brazilian expatriate sportspeople in Lithuania
Expatriate footballers in Germany
Brazilian expatriate sportspeople in Germany